The 1972 Southwestern Louisiana Bulldogs football team was an American football team that represented the University of Southwestern Louisiana (now known as the University of Louisiana at Lafayette) in the Southland Conference during the 1972 NCAA College Division football season. In their twelfth year under head coach Russ Faulkinberry, the team compiled an 5–6 record.

Schedule

References

Southwestern Louisiana
Louisiana Ragin' Cajuns football seasons
Southwestern Louisiana Bulldogs football